

Regular season

Relegation playoffs

Júver Murcia and Ferrys Llíria, relegated to 1ª División. As BFI Granollers is dissolved, Júver Murcia stays at Liga ACB.

Championship Playoffs

External links
 ACB.com 
 linguasport.com 

Liga ACB seasons
Spain